Skenderović is a Bosniak surname. Notable people with the surname include:

Aldin Skenderovic (born 1997), Luxembourger footballer
Haris Skenderović (born 1981), Bosnian footballer
Meris Skenderović (born 1998), Montenegrin footballer

Bosnian surnames
Montenegrin surnames
Slavic-language surnames
Patronymic surnames